Josh Woods (born 13 December 1997) is an English professional rugby league footballer who plays as a  or  for the Batley Bulldogs in the Championship.

Background
Woods was born in Leigh, Greater Manchester, England.

Career

Wigan Warriors
He played for the Wigan Warriors in the Betfred Super League, but spent the 2019 and 2020 seasons on loan at the Leigh Centurions.

In 2017 he made his Wigan Super League début against the Salford Red Devils.

Newcastle Thunder
On 21 December 2020 it was announced that Woods would join the Newcastle Thunder for the 2021 season.

Batley Bulldogs
On 4 November 2022 it was announced that Woods would join the Batley Bulldogs for the 2023 season.

References

External links
Wigan Warriors profile
SL profile

1997 births
Living people
Batley Bulldogs players
English rugby league players
Leigh Leopards players
Newcastle Thunder players
Rugby league five-eighths
Rugby league players from Leigh, Greater Manchester
Wigan Warriors players